Easton High School is a high school in Easton, Maryland.

Easton High School may also refer to:
Warren Easton High School in New Orleans, Louisiana
Easton Area High School in Easton, Pennsylvania